Pateclizumab (MLTA3698A) is an immunomodulator. It binds to lymphotoxin alpha.

This drug was developed by Genentech/Roche.

References 

Monoclonal antibodies